The Breznik dialect is a Bulgarian dialect, member of the Transitional dialects, which is spoken in the region of Graovo in central western Bulgaria. It borders on the Tran dialect to the west and north, the Kyustendil dialect to the south and the Sofia dialect to the northeast and features characteristics typical for the Southwestern Bulgarian dialects.

Phonological and morphological characteristics
 шч/дж (/) for Proto-Slavic /: лешча, меджу vs. Standard Bulgarian  (lentils, between).
 Definite articles  as in Standard Bulgarian
 Vowel -e instead of -x in the forms of past imperfect tense: биее vs. Standard Bulgarian биех (I was beating)
The dialect is dynamic and is well known for the shortening of the words.

For other phonological and morphological characteristics typical for all Transitional dialects, cf. Transitional Bulgarian dialects.

Sources
Стойков, Стойко: Българска диалектология, Акад. изд. "Проф. Марин Дринов", 2006 

Dialects of the Bulgarian language